Vladislav Mukhamedov (born 4 January 1998) is a Belarusian professional footballer.

Honours
BATE Borisov
Belarusian Premier League champion: 2017, 2018
Belarusian Cup winner: 2019–20

References

External links 
 
 Profile at BATE Borisov website
 

1998 births
Living people
Lipka Tatars
Belarusian footballers
Association football forwards
FC BATE Borisov players
FC Smolevichi players
FC Energetik-BGU Minsk players
FC Dnepr Mogilev players